My Dangerous Mafia Retirement Plan (literally "Triad Boss Under the Line of Fire") is a 2016 Hong Kong modern comedy television drama produced by Leung Choi-yuen for TVB, starring Kent Cheng, Tommy Wong, Alice Chan and Eliza Sam as the main leads. Filming took place from October 2015 to February 2016 on location in Hong Kong. The series premiered on April 25, 2016, airing every Monday to Friday on Hong Kong's TVB Jade, Malaysia's Astro On Demand and Australia's TVBJ channels during its 8:30-9:30 pm timeslot, concluding May 27, 2016 with a total of 25 episodes.

My Dangerous Mafia Retirement Plan plot centers on triad members who are no longer in their prime and must learn to survive in middle age. It also tells of triads who must learn to adjust to life outside once they are released from incarceration after serving a long prison sentence.

Synopsis
Former triad Ho Kei-song (Kent Cheng) has put his former gang life behind to become a chef and later owner of his own small restaurant since falling in love with his current wife So Yau-lam (Alice Chan) and wanting to provide a stable family life for his daughter Joyce Ho Fuen-sam (Eliza Sam). Life is good as Kei-song and Yau-lam make a good living at their small restaurant and Kei-song's cooking is popular with the locals that frequent his restaurant. Also with Yau-lam's help of providing a mother figure to Joyce, Joyce is a university graduate who works as an investment banker. Their happy family life is threatened when Kei-song's triad boss Lau Cheuk-nam (Tommy Wong) is set to be released from prison after serving twenty years in jail. Not only does Cheuk-nam wants to pull Kei-song back into triad life but Kei-song and Yau-lam's marriage is also put on the line as Yau-lam was Cheuk-nam's girlfriend who never officially broke up with him.

Cast

Ho & So family
Kent Cheng as Ho Kei-song (何其爽)
Willie Wai as young Ho Kei-song (青年何其爽) 
A former triad member who was part of Lau Cheuk-nam's gang.  Lau Cheuk-nam's closes and most trusted friend. He fell in love with So Yau-lam when he was taking care of her while Cheuk-nam was in prison. Owner and head chef of Zui Song Song Restaurant. So Yau-lam's husband and Joyce's father. 
Alice Chan as So Yau-lam (蘇佑琳)
Roxanne Tong as young So Yau-lam (青年蘇佑琳)
Lau Cheuk-nam's ex-girlfriend who never officially broke up with him. Ho Kei-song's wife and Joyce's stepmother. She and Joyce have a sisterly relationship. So Yau-miu's younger sister. Owns Zui Song Song Restaurant with Kei-song. she works the front of the restaurant as a greeter and cashier.
Sonija Kwok was originally cast, but due to a contract issue, she had to turn down the role
Kingdom Yuen as So Yau-miu (蘇佑妙)
Winki Lai as young So Yau-miu (青年蘇佑妙)
So Yau-lam's older sister. She owns a beauty cosmetic shop that sells cheap and expired products. She lives together with Kei-song, Yau-lam and Joyce. In order to lie to Lau Cheuk-nam and protect Yau-lam, she and Kei-song pretend to be a married couple. She and Ko Kar start out as bickering enemies because he always exposes her cosmetic products as bad but the two later end up together.
Eliza Sam as Joyce Ho Fuen-sam (何寬心)
Ho Kei-song's daughter and Yau-lam's stepdaughter. She works as an investment consultant manager at an investment company. Her enemy at work is the scantily dressed Nicole who is looking to ruin her at work. She is a lion dance student at Ko Kar's Martial Art School and is also the best friend and co-worker of Ko Kar's nephew, Ko Kai. She develops a friendship with police officer Liu Shau-Kei whom she originally mistakes as a restroom pervert and later falls in love with him.

Lau's gang
Tommy Wong as Lau Cheuk-nam (柳卓南)
Eric Li as young Lau Cheuk-nam (青年柳卓南)
a triad boss who's imprisoned twenty years for smuggling gold. He is originally judged for 30 years, but was released 10 years earlier. He sees that everything has been changed since he was jailed. Cheuk-nam tries to redo the triad but did not succeed. Instead, he witnesses his way is no longer fits for the triad this time so he switches to quit the triad. He finds out that his gold is not confiscated and looks for the one that took his gold. It is finally revealed that it was stolen by his wife Yip Fong-fei (葉芳菲) who was taught by So Yau-miu. After he finds out that he was betrayed by his best friend and wife, he joins the Shark's gang and tries to get his money, but the plan is exposed and he was fought. Later he is judged for murdering Shark while the real murderer is Crab.

Liu family
Law Lok-lam as Sir Liu
Kitterick Yiu
a policeman and Shau-Kei's father and Lady Win's husband. When he was younger, he was injured by Ho's gang when he joined the police force and was against the triad bureau, so he is very much against Sau-Kei's relationship with Joyce.
Rainbow Ching as Lady Win. A TV host for a popular dining program, Sau-Kei's mother and Liu's wife.
Mat Yeung as Liu Sau-Kei (廖守基) (homophone to cellphone with pee, 尿手機), a CID officer, Liu and Win's son. He is in love with Joyce, but due to his father being once injured by Ho's gang, he is having a hard time being with Joyce.

Ko family & students
Li Shing-cheong as Ko Kar (高卡) (homophone to high class in the typical Hong Kong pronunciation), a physician and host of Ko Kar Martial Arts School. He is Ko Kai's uncle. He is later with So Yau-miu.
Joel Chan as Ko Kai (高佳) (homophone to high level, 高階), son of Ko Tau (高斗) and nephew of Ko Kar, a security for Joyce company's building. His father is a businessman running a petroleum enterprise in Brunei. He also learns the lion dance from his uncle Ko Kar. He has been in love with Joyce for a long time but also acknowledges that they are not possible to be a couple. He finally chooses Tina as his girlfriend.
Cilla Kung as Ko Kar Martial Arts School student.
Hero Yuen as Ko Kar Martial Arts School student.
Hoffman Cheng as Ko Kar Martial Arts School student.

Zui Song Song Restaurant staff
Russell Cheung
King Kong Lee as 
Sunny Tai as 
Lee Yee-man as 
Eddie Ho
Jack Hui as

USB Finance Corporation staff
Henry Yu as 
Ada Wong as
Akai Lee as 
William Chu as
Chloe Nguyen as
Doris Chow as
Joan Lee as
Kate Tsang as

Hong Kong Police
Au Hin-Wai as
Billy Cheung as 
Derek Wong as 
Jess Sum as Tina

Viewership ratings

Awards and nominations

References

External links
My Dangerous Mafia Retirement Plan Official TVB website 

TVB dramas
Hong Kong television series
2016 Hong Kong television series debuts
2016 Hong Kong television series endings
2010s Hong Kong television series
Triad (organized crime)